Harish Raj is an Indian actor and director based in Kannada cinema. He made his acting debut in the television serial Hosa Chiguru Hale Beru in 1996 and his debut in feature films was with Doni Saagali in 1998. After featuring in a string of films and serials, Raj moved into film direction with Kalaakaar (2009). He also acted in several Malayalam and Tamil films  and Hindi television serials. He also performed in television commercials.

He is best known as an actor in critically acclaimed films such as Dweepa, Koormavatara, Thaayi Saheba, and Kaanuru Heggadathi.

Personal life
Harish Raj was born and raised in Bangalore, Karnataka, India. He completed his M.A in English from Karnataka State Open University. He married a Lingayat, Shruthi Lokesh in 2014, and together they have two daughters.

Filmography

Kannada films

Other language films

TV serials

Participated in Bigg Boss Kannada (season 7) as contestant.

References

External links 
 

Male actors from Bangalore
Living people
Male actors in Kannada cinema
Indian male film actors
Kannada film directors
Indian male television actors
21st-century Indian male actors
Film directors from Bangalore
21st-century Indian film directors
Male actors in Kannada television
Male actors in Hindi television
Male actors in Tamil cinema
Male actors in Malayalam cinema
Year of birth missing (living people)